Medial wall can refer to:
 Nasal septum
 Labyrinthine wall of tympanic cavity